The 1986–87 UEFA Cup was the 16th season of the UEFA Cup, a football competition organised by the Union of European Football Associations (UEFA) for clubs affiliated to its member associations. The competition was won by IFK Göteborg of Sweden, who beat Scotland's Dundee United 2–1 on aggregate in the final. This was the second season in which all English clubs were banned from European football competitions, preventing West Ham United, Manchester United, Sheffield Wednesday and Oxford United from competing.

Format
Following UEFA ranking changes and the English ban, Italy gained a fourth place from Spain, and East Germany a third one from the Netherlands.

First round

|}

First leg

Second leg

Beveren won 1–0 on aggregate.

Swarovski Tirol won 3–2 on aggregate.

Universitatea Craiova won 3–2 on aggregate.

Trakia Plovdiv won 10–0 on aggregate.

Stahl Brandenburg won 2–1 on aggregate.

Borussia Mönchengladbach won 4–1 on aggregate.

Vitória de Guimarães won 3–2 on aggregate.

Győri ETO won 4–3 on aggregate.

Groningen won 8–2 on aggregate.

3–3 on aggregate; Dukla Prague won on away goals.

Widzew Łódź won 2–1 on aggregate.

Legia Warsaw won 1–0 on aggregate.

Hajduk Split won 4–1 on aggregate.

Rangers won 4–2 on aggregate.

Neuchâtel Xamax won 5–1 on aggregate.

IFK Göteborg won 5–1 on aggregate.

Bayer Leverkusen won 7–1 on aggregate.

Athletic Bilbao won 2–1 on aggregate.

Atlético Madrid won 3–2 on aggregate.

Gent won 3–2 on aggregate.

Bayer 05 Uerdingen won 7–0 on aggregate.

1–1 on aggregate; Toulouse won 4–3 on penalties.

Standard Liège won 2–1 on aggregate.

Feyenoord won 2–1 on aggregate.

Spartak Moscow won 1–0 on aggregate.

Torino won 5–1 on aggregate.

Dundee United won 2–1 on aggregate.

Sportul Studențesc won 2–1 on aggregate.

1–1 on aggregate; Barcelona won on away goals.

Sporting CP won 15–0 on aggregate.

Internazionale won 3–0 on aggregate.

1–1 on aggregate; Boavista won 3–1 on penalties.

Second round

|}

First leg

Second leg

1–1 on aggregate; Dukla Prague won on away goals.

Rangers won 3–1 on aggregate.

Dundee United won 3–1 on aggregate.

IFK Göteborg won 3–1 on aggregate.

Hajduk Split won 5–3 on aggregate.

Torino won 5–1 on aggregate.

3–3 on aggregate; Internazionale won on away goals.

Spartak Moscow won 6–4 on aggregate.

Borussia Mönchengladbach won 7–1 on aggregate.

1–1 on aggregate; Groningen won on away goals.

4–4 on aggregate; Swarovski Tirol won on away goals.

Gent won 4–1 on aggregate.

Bayer 05 Uerdingen won 2–0 on aggregate.

Beveren won 4–3 on aggregate.

Vitória de Guimarães won 2–1 on aggregate.

2–2 on aggregate; Barcelona won on away goals.

Third round

|}

First leg

Second leg

Vitória de Guimarães won 3–1 on aggregate.

Dundee United won 2–0 on aggregate.

Torino won 3–1 on aggregate.

IFK Göteborg won 5–0 on aggregate.

Swarovski Tirol won 2–1 on aggregate.

1–1 on aggregate; Borussia Mönchengladbach won on away goals.

Barcelona won 4–0 on aggregate.

The game was abandoned in the 70th minute because of the dense fog and replayed a week later.

Internazionale won 1–0 on aggregate.

Quarter-finals

|}

First leg

Second leg

Borussia Mönchengladbach won 5–2 on aggregate.

Swarovski Tirol won 2–1 on aggregate.

1–1 on aggregate; IFK Göteborg won on away goals.

Dundee United won 3–1 on aggregate.

Semi-finals

|}

First leg

Second leg

IFK Göteborg won 5–1 on aggregate.

Dundee United won 2–0 on aggregate.

Final

First leg

Second leg

IFK Göteborg won 2–1 on aggregate.

Notes

References

External links
1986–87 All matches UEFA Cup – season at UEFA website
Official Site
Results at RSSSF.com
 All scorers 1986–87 UEFA Cup according to protocols UEFA
1986/87 UEFA Cup - results and line-ups (archive)

UEFA Cup seasons
2